Several different denominations and sects of Islam are practised within Syria, whom collectively, constitute approximately 87% of the population and form a majority in most of the districts of the country.

The Sunni Muslims make up the vast majority in the country. The Alawites are the minority group (10% of the country's population), followed by Shia Ismailis. Christians are the main non-Muslim group in the country, they comprise 10% of the population .

The Sunnis are mainly of the Hanafi and Shafi'i madhhabs. Some Sufi orders are active in the country, including the Naqshbandiya, the Qadiriya and the Shadhiliya. Sufi numbers have significantly decreased since the turn of the century, most sufis identify as sunni. Although not traditionally considered as Muslims, the Druze make up 3% of the total population.

History
In 634–640, as part of the Muslim conquest of the Levant, Syria was conquered by the Muslim Arabs in the form of the Rashidun army led by Khalid ibn al-Walid, under the overall leadership of Abu Bakr, resulting in the region becoming part of the Islamic empire. In 635 Damascus surrendered, its inhabitants being promised security for their lives, property, and churches, on payment of a poll tax. It led to Muslim Rashidun control over the entire Levant and brought about major changes to Levantine religious, cultural and social fabric that continue to this day. Until then, Syria was the main center of Eastern Orthodox Christianity. Conversion to Islam had scarcely begun prior to the invasion, apart from Arab tribes already settled in Syria; except for the tribe of Ghassan, these all became Muslim. The loyalty of his new subjects was paramount to the success of Muslim rule in the region, therefore excessive taxation or oppression was avoided. In the mid-7th century, the Umayyad dynasty, then rulers of the empire, placed the capital of the empire in Damascus.

As in other areas conquered by the Arabs, the spread of Islam was also accompanied with the spread of Arab culture, which culminated in the Arabization of the Levant and the replacement of Aramaic with Arabic.

Throughout Syria's Islamic history, the region was a province of many Islamic empires, formed of various ethnic and Islamic sects. The first successors to the Sunni Umayyad rulers were also Arabs, including the Iraq-centered Abassids (Sunni rulers) followed by the Egypt-centered Fatimids (Shia rulers). Several non-Arab Islamic empires also ruled Syria whilst centered in Egypt (particularly in Cairo), including the Ayyubids (Sunni rulers of Kurdish origin), and the Mamluks (Sunni rulers of Turkic and Circassian origin). The last Islamic empires in Syria were centered firstly in Iran, namely the Seljuks (Sunni rulers of Turkic origin), and finally the Ottomans (Sunni rulers of Turkish origin) who were centered in the Constantinople (modern-day Istanbul), which straddles both Europe and Asia (i.e. Anatolia).

Official censuses

Sects
Albert Hourani published statistics from a general census of Syria in 1943 giving details of religious groups of the population and the rate of growth of each (citizens were not allowed to declare their ethnicity or mother tongue):

Sunni Islam

The largest religious group in Syria is the Sunni Muslims. The majority are formed of indigenous Syrian but there is also a significant number of Sunni Kurds, Turkmen/Turkoman, and Circassians, as well as refugees who have arrived in the country, such as Iraqis and Palestinians. Sunnis follow nearly all occupations, belong to all social groups and nearly every political party, and live in all parts of the country. All the largest cities and thirteen out of the fourteen governorates’ capitals of the country had a Sunni majority, except for the governorate and city of Suwayda.

Arabic-speaking Syrians
The Arabic-speaking Syrians form the largest Sunni Muslim community in the country. In 1991 Professor Alasdair Drysdale and Professor Raymond Hinnebusch said that approximately 60% of the country was formed of Arabic-speaking Sunni Muslims. More recently, Dr. Pierre Beckouche also said that the Arab Sunni Muslims formed 60% of the population, including 500,000 Palestinian refugees. Mid-2018 estimates accounting for deaths and emigration due to the Syrian Civil War placed Arab Sunnis far lower, at 50%. Although the majority of Sunni Syrians are listed as Arabs in some academic circles, this is a term based on spoken language (Arabic), not ethnicity. Some Muslim minorities in Syria have been Arabized to some degree, particularly the smaller ethnic groups (such as the Albanians, Bosnians, Cretan Muslims, Pashtuns, Persians, etc.), but also some members of the larger minorities, such as the Kurds and Turkmen.

Kurds

The Kurds in Syria are the second largest ethnic group in the country (forming around 10.6% of the population) and are mainly Sunni Muslims. The majority live in the northeast, bordering on Iraq and Turkey. There are also smaller Kurdish communities in central Syria, followed by Kobanî and Afrin. In the capital of Damascus they are Arabized and do not speak Kurdish very well.

In 1973 Professor Moshe Ma'oz said that the non-Arabic-speaking Sunni Muslim Kurds formed 8.3% of the population. By 1979 Dr. Nikolaos van Dam claimed that the Syrian Kurds (forming 8.5% of the population at the time) were almost exclusively Sunni Muslims. Dr Henry Munson said that Sunni Muslim Kurds formed 9% of the population in 1988, whilst Professor Alasdair Drysdale and Professor Raymond Hinnebusch said that they formed 8.5% in 1991. In recent decades, the population of other religious minorities (particularly Christians and Jews) has decreased, therefore, estimates on the proportion of Sunni Kurds has increased. For example, Dr. Pierre Beckouche has said that before 2011 the Sunni Muslim Kurds formed 9-10% of the country's population.

Turkmen

The Turkish-speaking Turkmen are the third largest ethnic group in the country (approximately 4% to 5% of the country's population) and are mainly Sunni Muslims. They mainly live in the urban centres and countryside of the following six governorates: the Aleppo Governorate, the Damascus Governorate, the Homs Governorate, the Hama Governorate, the Latakia Governorate and the Quneitra Governorate.

In 1973 Professor Moshe Ma'oz said that the non-Arabic-speaking Sunni Muslim Turkmen formed 3% of the population. According to Dr. Nikolaos van Dam the Syrian Turkmen/Turkoman (forming 3% of the population at the time) were almost exclusively Sunni Muslims. Similarly, Dr Henry Munson said that Sunni Muslim Turkmen formed 3% of the population in 1988, as did Professor Alasdair Drysdale and Professor Raymond Hinnebusch in 1991. In recent decades, the population of other religious minorities (particularly Christians and Jews) has decreased, therefore, estimates on the proportion of Sunni Turkmen has increased. For example, Dr. Pierre Beckouche said that before 2011 the Sunni Muslim Turkmen/Turkoman formed 4% of the country's population.

However, the Sunni Turkmen population is believed to be considerably higher if Arabized Turkmen are also taken into consideration (i.e. Arabic-speaking Turkmen who no longer speak their mother tongue), and some estimates indicate that the total Turkmen population (who are mostly Sunni) might be the second biggest group in the country, outnumbering the Kurds.

Circassians

Most Circassians in Syria are Sunni Muslims. They form the fifth largest ethnic group in the country but the fourth largest Sunni Muslim community in Syria. They live mostly in three Syrian governorates: Hama, Homs, and Quneitra.

In 1991 Professor Alasdair Drysdale and Professor Raymond Hinnebusch said that less than 1% of the country was formed of Sunni Muslim Circassians. In recent decades, the population of other religious minorities (particularly Christians and Jews) has decreased, therefore, estimates on the proportion of Sunni Circassians has increased. For example, a more recent estimate suggested that Sunni Circassians formed 1.5% of Syria's population.

Alawites

The Alawites are the second largest religious group in Syria, after the Sunni Muslims. Hafez al-Assad and his son, President Bashar al-Assad, belong to the Alawite sect.

Alawites are divided into two main groups: traditional Alawites, who form the majority, and the minority Murshid Alawites (which rose from a modern schism in the Alawite sect at the beginning of the 20th century).

In 1991 Professor Alasdair Drysdale and Professor Raymond Hinnebusch said that Alawites formed approximately 11.5% of the country's population. More recently, Dr. Pierre Beckouche said that 11% of the country's population was Alawite before 2011. The CIA has estimated Alawites at 15% of the Syria's population.

The Alawites mainly live in the Syrian Coastal Mountain Range, particularly in the countryside of the Latakia Governorate and the Tartus Governorate on the western side of the mountains, and in the countryside of the Homs Governorate and Hama Governorate on their eastern side. They form a majority (around 60%) in Latakia and Tartus. In the Homs and Hama areas, they make up around 10% of the population in both the countryside and the cities, living in Talkalakh, Al-Mukharram, Al-Qabu, Shin, Al-Riqama, the Houla plain, Maryamin, Qarmas, Al Muhani, and the areas of Zahra and Naziha.

Alevis

In northern Syria there are some Kurdish and Turkmen Alevi. The town of Maabatli in Afrin district is majority inhabited by Kurdish Alevis. In 2014 Hêvî Îbrahîm, an Alevi, became the Prime Minister of the Kurdish-controlled Afrin Canton. Thousands of Turkmen Alevis are living in Aleppo, though many of them fled to Turkey.

Shia
The third largest sect of Islam practiced in the country is the Shia branch; this includes Ismailis and orthodox Twelvers. Before 2011, they formed a sizeable minority. These Muslim sects also include diverse ethnic groups, which included: the Arabs, Kurds, Turkmen, and other smaller communities.

Ismailis 

The Shia Ismailis form the largest branch of Shia Islam in Syria, forming 3% of Syria's population. The split from the greater branch occurred over the recognition of the Seventh Imam. Shia Ismailis believe that Ja'far al-Sadiq, the Sixth Imam, appointed Isma'il to be the Seventh Imam, a line that continues unbroken to the present day, the office currently sitting with His Highness the Aga Khan. The Shia Ithna Asharia, however, believe that Jafar appointed Isma'il's brother Musa al Kadhim to be the Seventh Imam, a line of Imamat that ended with the 12th Imam of the Ithna Asharia. Little is known of the early history of the sect, but it was firmly established by the end of the ninth century. From 969 to 1171, an Ismaili dynasty, the Fatimids, ruled as caliphs in Egypt. The Ismaili power in Syria was stamped out by the Mamluk dynasty of Egypt, after the former offered the Crusaders their allegiance and conversion to Christianity – which were rejected by the Knights Templar.

Ismailis are divided into two major groups: the Mustali and the Nizari.

According to Professor Alasdair Drysdale and Professor Raymond Hinnebusch the Ismailis formed 1.5% of the country's population in 1991. They mainly in live in two governorates: in the Hama Governorate the Ismailis mainly live in the city of Salamiyah, which is considered to be the "Ismaili capital". They also live in the city of Masyaf and in the surrounding countryside, as well as a small minority living in the city of Hama. In addition, Ismailis also live in the Tartus Governorate, particularly in the town of Qadmus and its surrounding countryside and in the district and villages of Nahr al-Khawabi.

Twelver 

Forming the smallest of the Islamic sects in Syria at 2%, the Twelver Shia play only a minor role in Syrian politics. In religious affairs, they look to Shia centers in Iraq, especially Karbala and Najaf, and to Iran. However, Iran's 1979 Islamic Revolution and Syria's alliance with Iran in its war with Iraq, have elevated the prestige of Syria's Shia minority. As hundreds of Iranian tourists began to visit Damascus each week, the Shia shrine of the tomb of Sayyida Zaynab, granddaughter of Muhammad, located in Al-Ghutah outside Damascus, became a major pilgrimage destination, replacing those areas no longer accessible in Iraq. Moreover, the Syrian Shia Twelvers have close links to the Shia Twelvers in Lebanon.

Druze

The Syrian Druze community constitute the third largest Islamic influenced sect in the country, they are not traditionally considered as Muslims, forming approximately 4% of the population of Syria. The main centre of the Druze population is in As-Suwayda; the small towns and villages under its authority is called the Jabal al-Druze (the "Mountain of the Druze"). The rest of the community mainly live in the Quneitra Governorate, the Rif Dimashq Governorate, and the Idlib Governorate. Even though the faith originally developed out of Ismaili Islam, most Druze do not identify as Muslims, and they do not accept the five pillars of Islam.

There are many Syrian Druze that are also living abroad, particularly in Latin America, who have been living there for over the past hundred years. In Venezuela alone there are approximately half a million Druze of Syrian origin.

Ahmadiyya

The history of the movement in Syria begins in the 1920s, when the second caliph of the Community, Mirza Basheer-ud-Din Mahmood Ahmad visited Damascus, as part of his tour of Europe and the Middle East. The caliph appointed Sayyid Zayn al'Abidin Waliullah Shah and Jalal al-Din Shams to be sent for missionary work in Damascus. Along with Maulvi Abu'l-'Ata Jalandhari, who arrived for a mission in Jerusalem, the three missionaries spent their time spreading Ahmadi teachings in major towns and cities across the Middle East, including Haifa, Beirut and Cairo.

Quraniya
There is also a Quraniya or Quranist community within Syria, whose early documentation began forming in the 19th century and followed the teachings set forth by the Indian theologian Seyyid Ahmed Khan Hindi and then spread to Syria soon afterwards via intermediary pilgrims. However, Ahl al-Qur'an adherents precede these 19th century developments in the form of Mu'tazilites such as Ibrahim al-Nazzam, who lived for some period in these environs. Contemporary adherents of the Quranist point of view in Syria include Muhammad Shahrur.

See also
 Islamization
 Spread of Islam
 Muslim conquests
 List of mosques in Syria
 Religion in Syria

References

Bibliography

External links
 Islamic Education in Syria

 
Syria
Muslim conquest of the Levant